M'Lady was a hit for John Rowles. Following the success he had in New Zealand with "The Pain Goes On Forever", M'Lady became a New Zealand chart tropper.

Background
"M’Lady" was a New Zealand release for John Rowles and was released while he was on tour there. He told an Auckland DJ that it was his best up-tempo song to date. For the week ending April 19, 1969, the song entered the New Zealand Top Ten at #10. The following week it had moved up one notch to #9. The song eventually went to the top of the NZ charts.

References

External links
 NZ On Screen: M'Lady

John Rowles songs
1969 singles
1969 songs
CBS Records singles
Song recordings produced by Mike Leander